Marcel Domingo Algara (15 January 1924 – 10 December 2010) was a French football goalkeeper and manager of Spanish origin. 

He spent part of his career in Spain. Domingo coached RCD Espanyol, UD Las Palmas, UE Lleida, Pontevedra CF, Córdoba CF, Granada CF, Atlético de Madrid, CD Málaga, Elche CF, Burgos CF, Valencia CF, OGC Nice, Real Betis, RCD Mallorca, Nîmes Olympique, AC Arles and Hércules CF.

Domingo died at the age of 86.

Honours

Player 
Nice
 Division 1: 1952
 Coupe de France: 1952

Atlético Madrid
 Spanish League: 1949–50, 1950–51

Individual
 Ricardo Zamora Trophy: 1949, 1953

Manager 
Pontevedra
 Segunda División: 1964–65

Atlético Madrid
 Spanish League: 1969–70
 Copa del Generalísimo:  1971–72

Valencia
 Copa del Rey: 1978–79

References

External links

 Profile
 Career

1924 births
2010 deaths
French people of Spanish descent
French footballers
France international footballers
Association football goalkeepers
Ligue 1 players
OGC Nice players
Stade Français (association football) players
RCD Espanyol footballers
Atlético Madrid footballers
Olympique de Marseille players
French football managers
French expatriate football managers
RCD Espanyol managers
UD Las Palmas managers
UE Lleida managers
Pontevedra CF managers
Córdoba CF managers
Granada CF managers
Atlético Madrid managers
CD Málaga managers
Elche CF managers
Burgos CF (1936) managers
Valencia CF managers
OGC Nice managers
Real Betis managers
RCD Mallorca managers
Nîmes Olympique managers
Hércules CF managers